This is a list of Swedish television related events from 1992.

Events
9 May - The 37th Eurovision Song Contest is held at the Malmö Isstadion in Malmö. Ireland wins the contest with the song "Why Me?", performed by Linda Martin.

Debuts

Domestic
2 December - K-T.V. (1992-1997) (Filmnet)

Television shows
29 November-24 December - Klasses julkalender

Ending this year

Births

Deaths

See also
1992 in Sweden

References